Malmö FF won its first league title since 1988, thanks to smart spending of the 9 million € transfer money of Zlatan Ibrahimović three years earlier. Afonso Alves was the bearing player in the team, having signed from Örgryte IS for an estimated 1.2 million €. The title was won in front of 27 343 ecstatic supporters at Malmö Stadion. Malmö beat IF Elfsborg 1-0 thanks to Jon Inge Høiland scoring on a rebound, following Niklas Skoog's miss. Following a 2-1 victory at IFK Göteborg in front of almost 40 000 spectators earlier that week, IFK gave Malmö a helping hand by drawing against Halmstads BK 1-1 away from home, which proved crucial in securing Malmö's title. The club competed in Allsvenskan, Svenska Cupen and The UEFA Intertoto Cup for the 2004 season.

Players

Squad stats

|}

Club

Kit

|
|

Other information

Competitions

Allsvenskan

League table

Results summary

Matches

Svenska Cupen

Kickoff times are in UTC+2.

References
 

Malmö FF seasons
Malmo FF
Swedish football championship-winning seasons